Samuel Edgerton Lumpkin (April 21, 1908 – July 9, 1964) was an American politician from Tupelo, Mississippi. A Democrat, he served as the 21st Lieutenant Governor of Mississippi from 1948 to 1952 under Governor Fielding L. Wright. He was born in Hudsonville in 1908.

Before elevation to Lt. Governor he served in the Mississippi House of Representatives, eventually rising to position of the Speaker of the House in 1940

He was also a delegate to the 1948 Democratic National Convention and was an unsuccessful candidate for Democratic nomination for governor in 1951.

During the 1952 presidential election he endorsed Republican nominee, General Dwight D. Eisenhower and led so-called "eisencrats" faction in Mississippi.

Lumpkin was found dead of a heart attack at his home's pool in 1964.

References

Lieutenant Governors of Mississippi
Speakers of the Mississippi House of Representatives
Democratic Party members of the Mississippi House of Representatives
1908 births
1964 deaths
20th-century American politicians